The 2010 Summer Youth Olympics, the inaugural event of its kind, were celebrated in Singapore from 14 to 26 August 2010. A total of 3,531 athletes between 14 and 18 years of age from 204 National Olympic Committees (NOCs) participated at the Games in 201 events in 26 sports.

A number of new events were held, including mixed-gender swimming relays, a single combined mixed-gender cycling event, and a number of mixed-NOCs team events. To foster friendship among participants, teams were formed by athletes from different countries to compete, often on an intercontinental basis. There were such events included in archery, athletics, equestrian, fencing, judo, modern pentathlon, table tennis, and triathlon, and a number of pairs in doubles tennis were formed by athletes from two different NOCs. In addition, some traditional events at the main Olympic Games were modified, most notably in basketball, which was contested according to FIBA 33 rules.

A total of 623 medals for events (202 gold, 200 silver and 221 bronze) were awarded; in judo and taekwondo two bronzes were awarded per event. Therefore, the total number of bronze medals is greater than the total number of gold or silver medals. Additionally there were ties for a gold medal and a bronze medal, both in swimming. On 15 October 2010 the IOC announced that an Uzbek silver medallist had failed a drugs test and had been disqualified, but no immediate decision was taken on whether to promote the next two athletes.

Athletes representing China won the most gold medals (not counting mixed-NOCs events) with 30, and also won the most medals overall with 51. Athletes from 98 countries won medals at the Games. The most decorated athlete at these Games was Tang Yi, who won six gold medals in swimming.

{| id="toc" class="toc" summary="Contents"
|align="center"|Contents
|-
|
Archery
Athletics
Badminton
Basketball
Boxing
Canoeing
Cycling
Diving
Equestrian
Fencing
|valign=top|
Field hockey
Football
GymnasticsArtisticRhythmicTrampoline
Handball
Judo
Modern pentathlon
Rowing
|valign=top|
Sailing
Shooting
Swimming
Table tennis
Taekwondo
Tennis
Triathlon
Volleyball
Weightlifting
Wrestling
|-
|align=center colspan=3| Medal winner changes       Medal leaders       References
|}

Archery

Athletics

Badminton

Basketball

Boxing

Canoeing

Cycling

Diving

Equestrian

Fencing

Field hockey

Football

Gymnastics

Artistic

Rhythmic

Trampoline

Handball

Judo

Modern pentathlon

Rowing

Sailing

Shooting

Swimming

Table tennis

Taekwondo

Tennis

Triathlon

Volleyball

Weightlifting

Wrestling

Medal winner changes
A. On 15 October 2010, the International Olympic Committee announced that Nurbek Hakkulov, who won a silver medal for Uzbekistan in wrestling, and Johnny Pilay who finished fifth in a separate wrestling event for Ecuador, had tested positive for a banned diuretic, furosemide. Both were disqualified and Hakkulov was stripped of his silver medal, although no decision was taken on whether to promote Shadybek Sulaimanov and Johan Rodriguez Banguela in the event.

Medal leaders

Athletes that won at least three medals or two gold medals are listed below.

References
General

 

Specific

medal winners
Lists of Youth Olympic medalists
Singapore sport-related lists